King's Highway 43, also known as Highway 43, was a provincially maintained highway in the Canadian province of Ontario. On January 1, 1998, the entire route was transferred to the county that each section resided in, resulting in the current designations of Lanark County Road 43, Leeds and Grenville Road 43 and Stormont, Dundas and Glengarry Road 43. Highway 43 ran somewhat parallel to and between Highway 401 and Highway 417 from Highway 7 in Perth to Highway 34 in Alexandria, passing through several small towns along the way. At ,
it is the longest highway in Ontario to be decommissioned entirely during the mass transfer of Highways in 1997 and 1998.

Route description 
Highway 43 began in the west at Highway 7 on the edge of Perth. It travelled eastward north of the Tay Canal and Lower Rideau Lake into Smiths Falls. After a brief concurrency with Highway 15 southwards, the route continued east nearby the Rideau Canal through Merrickville and Kemptville, meeting what was then a soon-to-open interchange with Highway 416 east of the latter.
The highway continued east, bypassing the communities of Winchester and Chesterville, jogging southwards several times. After bisecting Finch and skirting south of Avonmore, the route encountered Ontario Highway 138 before entering Monkland. After passing north of Loch Garry, Highway 43 entered Alexandria, ending at an intersection with Highway 34 (Main Street) in the centre of the town.

History 
Highway 43 was established in 1934, travelling between Highway 31 near Winchester to Highway 34 in Alexandria. In 1961, the Department of Highways extended Highway 43 westward  to Highway 7 in Perth. East of Smiths Falls, the new highway was created using existing county roads.
To the west, it assumed the previous route of Highway 15 to Perth. The route remained unchanged for the next 36 years until it was decommissioned entirely on January 1, 1998 as part of a series of budget cuts initiated by premier Mike Harris under his Common Sense Revolution platform. It was the longest King's Highway to be removed entirely from the system during these cuts, known as downloading (although Highway 2 lost significantly more of its length). Jurisdiction over the roadway was transferred to the counties and city that Highway 43 crossed: Lanark County, Smiths Falls, the United Counties of Leeds and Grenville and the United Counties of Stormont, Dundas and Glengarry. The United Counties of Leeds and Grenville is awaiting federal funding approval to begin an expansion of the roadway to four-lanes in Kemptville. A campaign was launched in November 2019 by the Municipality of North Grenville.

Major intersections

References 

043